Shelly Lee Alley (July 6, 1894 – June 1, 1964) was an American singer, musician, songwriter and western swing bandleader. As a songwriter, Alley wrote "Travelin' Blues" for Jimmie Rodgers, a song which has been recorded by over 20 artists, including Merle Haggard and Ernest Tubb. He is a member of the Western Swing Hall of Fame. He is considered one of Texas' best bandleaders of the 1930s and 1940s and a pioneer of western swing music.

Early life

Shelly Lee Alley was born in 1894 in Alleyton, Texas. His parents were Eliza Hoover Alley and John Ross Alley. John Ross operated a cotton gin. He had a brother named Alvin. Alley began reading music when he was a child.

Career

During World War I, Alley was the bandleader for a military orchestra in San Antonio, Texas. In the 1920s, he moved the Dallas-Fort Worth area and led pop and jazz dance and radio orchestras. He regularly appeared on KRLD with his bands.

While working in the Dallas-Fort Worth area, Alley met Jimmie Rodgers. Alley wrote "Gambling Barroom Blues" and "Traveling Blues" in 1931 for Rodgers. Alley recorded the latter song with Rodgers, playing fiddle alongside his brother, Alvin, on the recording. After the experience, Alley left swing music to focus on string band music. As of 1933, he had become the first leader of the Swift Jewel Cowboys. The band performed on XEPN. During this time, Alley gained interest in western swing music, a genre which merged his love for swing music and country. In 1936, he started the Alley Cats, who recorded songs for Vocalion Records, Bluebird Records and Okeh Records. Cliff Bruner, Leon Selph, Floyd Tillman and Ted Daffan were in the band.

The Alley Cats broke up during World War II. Alley performed with Patsy and the Buckaroos, a Beaumont, Texas based band. The band broke up in 1946. That same year, he retired from performing live, citing health problems as the reason. He continued to write music, writing "Broken Dreams" for Moon Mulligan and "Why Are You Blue?" for Biff Collie and Little Marge. In 1955, Alley released a single on Jet. He recorded also with Bennie Hess.

Later life and legacy

Alley died in 1964 in Houston, Texas. He is buried in Alleyton, Texas at the Alley Cemetery.

In 1994, Alley was inducted into the Western Swing Hall of Fame.

References

External links

1894 births
1964 deaths
People from Colorado County, Texas
Western swing fiddlers
Country music composers
American country banjoists
American country fiddlers
American country guitarists
American radio bandleaders
American jazz bandleaders
American male singer-songwriters
United States Army personnel of World War I
20th-century American male singers
20th-century American singers
Singer-songwriters from Texas